A Stockholm municipal election was held on 16 September 1973 to allocate the 101 seats of the Stockholm City Council (Stockholms stadsfullmäktige) amongst the various Swedish political parties using a party-list proportional representation system.  The election was held concurrently with a Swedish parliamentary election.  Voter turnout for the municipal election in Stockholm was 88.6%.

Results

References
Statistics Sweden, "Kommunfullmäktigval - valresultat" (Swedish) 
Statistics Sweden, "Kommunfullmäktigval - erhållna mandat efter kommun och parti. Valår 1973–2006" (Swedish)

See also
 Elections in Sweden

Municipal elections in Stockholm
1973 elections in Sweden
1970s in Stockholm
September 1973 events in Europe